Howat is a surname. Notable people with the surname include:

Alexander Howat (1876–1945), Scottish-born American coal miner and labor leader
Cameron Howat (born 1985), Australian rules footballer
Gerald Howat (1928–2007), British writer, historian and schoolmaster
Ian Howat (born 1958), Welsh footballer
John Howat (born 1970), Australian rules footballer
Roy Howat, Scottish classical pianist and musicologist
Rudolph Henderson Howat, Dean of Brechin from 1953 until 1957

See also
Howat Freemantle, main character in And Now Good-bye by James Hilton
Howatt (surname)
Hiwatt, British company
Howitt (surname)
Howittia, plant genus